Hash fossils are not actually one fossil, they are many fossils in the same rock. The term hash fossil describes the fossil formed when all the organic material in an environment falls to the ocean floor and fossilizes, hence the name "hash". When you look at a hash fossil, you actually are looking at a piece of ancient seabed. In hash fossils you can usually find the pieces of corals, crinoids, bryozoans, and brachiopods. Also you can rarely find a piece of a trilobite.  Hash fossils are very common, and are most easily found in limestone.

References

 New York state museum
A Complete Guide to Michigan Fossil Hunting: Joseph Kchodl
Fossil Hunting in the Great Lakes State: Jack Stack
A guide to Michigan Fossil Hunting by Michael Stack

Fossil record of animals